The deputy secretary of defense (acronym: DepSecDef) is a statutory office and the second-highest-ranking official in the Department of Defense of the United States of America.

The deputy secretary is the principal civilian deputy to the secretary of defense, and is appointed by the president, with the advice and consent of the Senate. The deputy secretary, by statute, is designated as the DoD chief management officer and must be a civilian, at least seven years removed from service as a commissioned officer on active-duty at the date of appointment.

The current deputy secretary of defense is Kathleen Hicks, effective February 8, 2021. Hicks is the first woman to serve in this role.

History
Public Law 81–36, April 2, 1949, originally established this position as the under secretary of defense, however Public Law 81-2 16, August 10, 1949, a.k.a. the 1949 Amendments to the National Security Act of 1947, changed the title to Deputy Secretary of Defense. Former assistant to President Franklin D. Roosevelt, Stephen Early, became the first officer holder when he was sworn-in on May 2, 1949.

Public Law 92-596, October 27, 1972, established a second deputy secretary of defense position, with both deputies performing duties as prescribed by the secretary of defense.  The second deputy position was not filled until December 1975. Robert Ellsworth, serving from December 23, 1975, until January 10, 1977, was the only one to ever hold that office. Public Law 95-140, October 21, 1977, established two Under Secretaries of Defense and abolished the second deputy position.

Responsibilities
By delegation, the deputy secretary of defense has full power and authority to act for the secretary of defense and to exercise the powers of the secretary of defense on any and all matters for which the secretary is authorized to act pursuant to statute or executive order. The deputy secretary is first in the line of succession to the secretary of defense.

The typical role of the deputy secretary of defense is to oversee the day-to-day business and lead the internal management processes of the $500-billion-plus Department of Defense budget, that is as its chief operating officer; while the secretary of defense as the chief executive officer focuses on the big issues of the day, ongoing military operations, high-profile congressional hearings, attending meetings of the National Security Council, and directly advising the president on defense issues.

Prior to February 1, 2018, the deputy secretary of defense also served as the department's chief management officer, to whom the deputy chief management officer reported, but those responsibilities were split into a new chief management officer of the Department of Defense position.

The deputy secretary, among the office's many responsibilities, chairs the Senior Level Review Group (SLRG), before 2005 known as Defense Resources Board (DRB), which provides department-wide budgetary allocation recommendations to the Secretary and the President. Traditionally, the deputy secretary has been the civilian official guiding the process of the Quadrennial Defense Review (QDR).

The deputy secretary of defense chairs the Special Access Program Oversight Committee (SAPOC), which has oversight responsibilities and provides recommendations with respect to changes in status of the Department's Special Access Programs, for either the deputy secretary defense or the secretary of defense to make.

List of deputy secretaries of defense

See also 
 Defense Acquisition Board
 Defense Policy Board Advisory Committee
 Deputy's Advisory Working Group, a panel chaired by the Deputy Secretary of Defense
 Packard Commission

Notes

References

Citations

Sources 
 
 
 Deputy Secretary of Defense position profile at Prunes Online

External links
 defense.gov

 
 
Defense